Cupcake (also known as a "Fairy Cake") is a small, single-serving cake, usually frosted.

Cupcake may also refer to:

Places
 Cupcake Peaks, a two rounded peaks, or nunataks, which rise to 1391 m 3 nautical miles (6 km) southeast of Mount Hamilton in Churchill Mountains
 Federal Prison Camp, Alderson or Camp Cupcake, a prison in the United States
 Johnson County, Kansas or Cupcake Land, a county in the central United States

People
 Cupcake Brown, an author of memoir A Piece of Cake: A Memoir
 Cupcakke (born 1997), an American rapper

Arts, entertainment, and media
 "Cupcake" (How I Met Your Mother), an episode of the sitcom How I Met Your Mother
 Cupcakes (band), a former power pop band from Chicago
 Cupcake Wars, a Food Network reality-based competition show
 "Cupcake", a song by Nellie McKay from the 2005 album Pretty Little Head

Computing and technology
 Android Cupcake, version 1.5 of the Android mobile operating system
 The Cupcake CNC fabber by MakerBot Industries

Other uses
 Captain Cupcake, the second mascot for Hostess brand baked goods along with Twinkie the Kid
 Georgetown Cupcake, a cupcakery, located in the Georgetown neighborhood of Washington, D.C.
 Rosa 'SPIcup' or Rosa Cupcake, a miniature hybrid tea rose